Naba Konwar (born 6 January 1959) is former Indian cricketer. He played first-class cricket for Assam. Konwar was a right-handed batsman and a left-arm medium bowler.

References

External links
 

1959 births
Living people
Indian cricketers
Assam cricketers
Cricketers from Guwahati
Cricketers from Assam